Louise U. Jones was a hotel proprietor and state legislator in Colorado. She represented the city and county of Denver in the Colorado House of Representatives. She ran the Hesse Hotel at the corner of  Grant Street and Colfax Avenue. She was a Democrat and served in the legislature in 1911 and 1912.

References

20th-century American women politicians
20th-century American politicians
20th-century American businesswomen
20th-century American businesspeople

Year of birth missing (living people)
Living people